Dioptis subalbata is a moth of the family Notodontidae first described by Paul Dognin in 1904. It is found in Bolivia.

References

Moths described in 1904
Notodontidae of South America